The Battle of Amoy was fought between British and Qing forces at Amoy (present-day Xiamen) on Xiamen Island, Fujian, in the Qing Empire on 26August 1841 during the First Opium War. The British captured the forts at Xiamen and on nearby Gulangyu Island (formerly Kulangsu Island).

Battle 
Before the engagement, Qing forces prepared defenses along the shores of Xiamen and built batteries on Gulangyu Island. The British began the battle by bombarding the island's batteries for two to four hours (sources vary), with little effect. Land forces then disembarked their transports and took the batteries with little resistance. The day was noted as being very hot and fatiguing to the men. Qing forces withdrew and the city fell the next day. A garrison force of 550 men, mostly from the 18th, and three ships — the Druid, Pylades, and the Algerine— were left moored at Gulangyu to defend Xiamen.

Commander John Elliot Bingham (late first lieutenant of HMS Modeste) wrote a detailed first-hand account of the battle from a British perspective.

British order of battle 

Ships: Wellesley, 74 ; Blenheim, 74 ; Blonde, 44;
Druid, 44 ; Modeste, 18 ; Cruizer, 18 ; Pylades, 18 ; Columbine, 16 ;
Bentinck, 10 ; Algerine, 10 ; Sesostris, 4 ; Phlegethon, 4 ; Nemesis, 4 ; Queen, 4

Gallery

References

Citations

Bibliography
Bingham, John Elliot (1843). Narrative of the Expedition to China from the Commencement of the War to Its Termination in 1842. Volume 2. London: H. Colburn.
Frontier and Overseas Expeditions From India. Vol. 6 (Expeditions Overseas). Calcutta: Superintendent Government Printing. 1911.
Hall, William Hutcheon; Bernard, William Dallas (1846). The Nemesis in China (3rd ed.). Henry Colburn.
Luxemburg, Rosa (1913) The Accumulation of Capital [Reprinted Routledge, 2013].
MacPherson, Duncan (1843). Two Years in China (2nd ed.). Saunders and Otley.

1841 in China
Amoy
Amoy
Amoy
August 1841 events
Amphibious operations involving the United Kingdom